Kaduthuruthy Marth Mariam Knanaya Major Archiepiscopal Church, commonly called Kaduthuruthy Valiapally or the Great Church of Kaduthuruthy, is a historic church founded by the Knanaya community in 400 C.E.  The Knanaya are the descendants of Syriac Judeo-Christians who migrated from Persian Mesopotamia to Kodungallur, Kerala during the medieval era.  

In 1911 the church was incorporated into Kottayam Knanaya Archeparchy of the Syro Malabar Catholic Church. Due to its historical significance, Kaduthuruthy Valiyapally holds the status of forane, or senior church among Knanaya churches within the Kaduthuruthy region. In 2020, along with other historic and prominent churches of the Syro Malabar communion, Kaduthuruthy Valiyapally was elevated to major archeparchial status.

History of the church

Kaduthuruthy St. Mary is known as Kaduthuruthy Muthiyamma (കടുത്തുരുത്തി മുത്തിയമ്മ). Kaduthuruthy Valiapally is one of the churches where Virgin Mary appeared in front of the devotees as an old woman (മുത്തിയമ്മ). Southists of Kaduthuruthy had been considering Virgin Mary is the patron of their church for the remembrance of their first set of churches in Kodungallur. According to Bishop Francis Roz in his report to Serra (1603/1604), says that he has read from a Chaldean book that there were 3 churches in Cranganore built by the Thomman Keenan and his descendants. Southist Christians of the Syriac Rite built 3 churches in Kodungallur immediately after they had been given permission to settle down in Kodungallur by the Chera King. They are in the Name of Virgin Mary, St. Thomas and St. Kuriakose. The old wooden buildings constructed for the first 3 churches are said to have last for four hundred years. First church building in Kaduthuruthy in the name of Virgin Mary (കന്നിയുമ്മ) had constructed from wooden logs in a square shape and known as Square Church. Those churches in Kodungallur constructed by Thomman Keenan and his companions were completely destroyed later, as a result of a continuous clash between the neighbouring kings.  But the church built in the name of St. Thomas had undergone many relocations and renovation, helped this church to survive until the 15th century and had reconstructed by Portuguese after the destruction of Cranganore. According to Mar Jacob Abuna (1533), Dionysio (1578), Bishop Francis Roz (1604) on their report says that the church which stood in Cranganore had been there from the third century and was built by Thomas of Cana. It is the Syriac liturgical tradition of Southists to being faithful to the Virgin Mary,  resulted them to accept Virgin Mary as the patron of the church built in Kaduthuruthy in fourth century. The same tradition is practiced in their other ancient churches like Udayamperoor, Mulanthuruthy, Kottayam Chungam and Kallissery. Later Southist community lost the control over the church in Mulanthuruthy and Udayamperoor. Their seamless faith is accounted by Virgin Mary and she revealed herself as an old woman in front of the devotees. This miraculous appearance of Virgin Mary happened in AD 1596, during the erection of the historic granite cross of Kaduthuruthy Vallyapalli. The sculpture and carving work of the Cross from a single stone block had completed with a total height of 50 feet in AD 1596. It is believed that the iconic Kaduthuruthy Vallyapalli Cross is the highest open air cross in Asia, made out from a single block. Being monolithic in its shape, which in fact proclaiming the glory of Kaduthuruthy Valiapally and the Southists of Kaduthuruthy. As it is gigantic in structure, it was very difficult to upright the cross and to position in the courtyard of the Vallyapalli. During that time when they faced difficulty to upright the cross, Virgin Mary-the patron of the Kaduthuruthy Valiapally revealed herself as an old woman (Muthiyamma) and helped them to upright the cross miraculously by supporting the cross by her hand. Kaduthuruthy Valiapally is one of the churches blessed by Virgin Mary by appearing in front of the devotees as an old woman. There after the Blessed Virgin Mary residing in Kaduthuruthy Valiapally known as Kaduthuruthy Muthiyamma. Bishop Alexis Dom Menesis had carried out the inaugural blessing of the Cross situated on the courtyard of this Church, during the Holy Friday of 1599.

Historic artifacts

Granite Cross 

The historic monolithic Cross in the Kaduthuruthy Valiapally is 50 feet in height and is the highest open air cross in Asia. Bishop Mar Abraham (1568-1597) directed the Southists to build a cross from a granite block and to place in the courtyard of the church. Southist soldiers of Kaduthuruthy effectively protected Mar Abraham by making a formation against Portuguese army and frequently changed his seat from Kaduthuruthy to Udayamperur, Kottayam and Chungam. Mar Abraham was the last bishop sent by East Syriac Catholicos to his Malabar church. The sculpture and carving work of the Cross from a single stone block had completed with a total height of 50 feet in AD 1596. It is believed that the iconic Kaduthuruthy Valiapally Cross is the highest open air cross in Asia, made out from a single block.  As it is gigantic in structure, it was very difficult to upright the cross and to position in the courtyard of the Valiapally. During that time when they faced difficulty to upright the cross, Virgin Mary-the patron of the Kaduthuruthy Vallyapalli revealed herself as an old woman (Muthiyamma) and helped them to upright the cross miraculously by supporting the cross by her hand. Kaduthuruthy Vallyapalli is one the church where Mother Mary appeared in front of the devotees as an old woman. There after the Blessed Virgin Mary residing in Kaduthuruthy Vallyapalli known as Kaduthuruthy Residing Muthiyamma (കടുത്തുരുത്തി വാഴു൦ മുത്തിയമ്മ). Mar Abraham died in 1597 and he could not carry out the inaugural blessing of the cross.

The year of 1599 had remarked with the arrival of Arch Bishop of Goa, Dom Alexis De Menesis to Kaduthuruthy. He believed that the Syriac rite followed by the St. Thomas Christians had the elements of Nesthorianism. He was intending to eliminate the involvement of the East Syriac Bishops and to get the solid sovereignty over the St. Thomas Christians. Portuguese scholar Anatonio De Gouve who was an aide to the Arch Bishop Menesis, gives a detailed description of Kaduthuruthy Valiapally in his book of Jornada of Dom Alexis De Menesis (1604). Bishop Dom Menesis sailed out from Goa and reached to Kaduthuruthy Valiapally in AD 1599. He stayed in kaduthuruthy to participate in the holy week celebrations of the Kaduthuruthy Vallyapalli and tried to attract the Southist Christians to Roman Catholic rite. Bishop Menesis had carried out the inaugural blessing of the Cross situated on the courtyard of this Church, during the Holy Friday of 1599. The famous liturgical celebration of "Purathu Namaskaram" (പുറത്തു നമസ്കാരം) is conducting on the base of this cross during the 3 Nombu Feast (3-Day Lent Feast). The base of the cross is adorned with many carvings and the relics of the Holy Cross of Jesus Christ bought in the 15th century had placed in a separate chamber of the base. The base which holds the Holy Relics of the Cross of Jesus Christ is 10 feet long, 10 feet breath and of 10 feet in height. There are many art works performed on the base of the cross like a scene of round dance performed by Southist Christians, a hunting scene, elephant, peacock, etc. On this base there are 153 lamps (ചുറ്റു വിളക്ക്) provided for the devotees to offer coconut oil, then to lighten the lamp by praying the Rosary of Virgin Mary. Devotes used to light the oil lamps during first Friday and 3-nombu feast either to get their wishes fulfilled or to express their sincere gratitude to the blessings they already received.

Ancient Bell made up of Five-Metal Alloy 
The west side of the church building has a huge bell tower which accommodates the ancient bell of kaduthuruthy Vallyapalli. The bell tower has become the important landmark of the Vallyapalli as it is visible from any extreme peak point anywhere in Kaduthuruthy. This ancient bell is made up of Five-Metal Alloy (Panchaloham/പഞ്ചലോഹ൦). The inscription on the bell can be read as 1647, which means the year it constructed and brought to Kaduthuruthy. Southist community peoples brought this bell from Portuguese when the church was under Portuguese administration. The majestic sound of Vallyapalli bell gives the peace and harmony among the peoples and the sound from the bell is audible to the peoples residing in places which are far away from Kaduthuruthy. The bell has designed and installed in such a way that the sound waves from the bell can travel to a long distances along with the wind directing from the east, when it comes favourable to the sound waves from the bell. 
The church bell lost its five-metal made tongue when the powerful king of Mysore, Tippu Sultan attacked Malabar in AD 1790. He defeated the local kings and his formations conquered the regions whose rulers refused to be a subordinate to Tippu Sulthan. He demanded ransom from the local rulers to avoid an attack and made them under his command.There was a rumour spreading across kaduthuruthy with a possible attack to kaduthuruthy as the king was heading towards Travancore. So the members of the church had to hide the precious items such as gold, silver and other vital properties of the church. They dismantled the bell from its seating and taken down to the tower to secure in underground by digging in various locations. They did the same with other vital properties of the church such as Cross, statues made up of gold and silver in different localities. Hiding the vital assets of the church under the ground was the immediate action against an expected attack to avoid collateral loss and property damage. They separated the bell and its tongue to secure down in earth in different points. But by the grace of Kaduthuruthy Vazhum Muthiyamma, Tippu Sulthan could not pass through kaduthuruthy. A major flooding occurred in Alwaye river prevented the advancement of Mysore army and the forward deployment of army formations, beyond the river. Later the members of the church recovered the items secured under to earth except the tongue of the bell. They could not find out the tongue from the place where they secured it. It is believed that the church lost the tongue of the bell along with the major flooding happened at that time. There had a temporary tongue made up of iron to continue the early morning ringing of the church bell. The present tongue is made up of bronze which replaced the iron made tongue because the tongue made up of iron was unable to give sufficient loudness. Though it is made up of bronze, still it is unable to give the actual loudness and bass sound, when compared to the original tongue.

First Friday Celebration 

First Friday Celebration is a long-standing practice and ancient tradition of Kaduthuruthy Valiapally and its Granite Cross as it is nominated as the Holy Cross of Jesus Christ. During the First Friday celebration thousands of pilgrims visits the Kaduthuruthy Vallyapalli and the Cross of Valiapally through fasting, prayer and repentance. First Friday is celebrated by taking a 1-day lent (ഒരു നേര൦) with sincere fasting and generous almsgiving to eradicate evil desires, relieve from sin and its consequences. One day lent is a strict practice of pilgrims consists in abstaining from all kinds of flesh meat, including fish, dairy products and eggs. Along with the Lent pilgrims visits the church to offer coconut oil to the lamps provided at the base of the granite Cross to obtain the infinite love and mercy of their Kaduthuruthy Muthiyamma. Pilgrims place their prayer and offering in front of the cross and beg to their Kaduthuruthy Vazhum Muthiyamma with tearful eyes to cure from diseases, for getting children for the childless, for safe guarding against natural calamities, for getting their wishes fulfilled. Another important liturgical celebration associated with Valiapally Cross is the procession by means of Crawling on Knees (നീന്തു നേർച്ച) which mainly has been observing in Goods Friday. This procession on knee is conducting in every year starting from the Eastern side main door of the church, turning around the granite cross by repeating the traditional Way of the Cross. Taking a 1-day lent is a strict practice during the Goods Friday celebrations.

Arch-Diocese of Kottayam 
Under the East Syriac Bishops, the Knanaya Community had their own churches and priests distinct from those of the St Thomas Christians. This system continued also under the Latin Rite bishops, who governed the St Thomas Christians. When a ritual separation was effected for the Catholics in Kerala between the Orientals and Latins in 1887, all the Knanaya Catholics were in the Apostolic Vicariate of Kottayam, and the Holy See ordered Bishop Charles Lavigne to appoint a separate Vicar General for the Knanaya Community. When the Vicariate Apostolic were re-organized into Trichur, Ernakulam and Changanassery and three indigenous bishops were appointed for the Syro-Malabarians in 1896. The bishop appointed for the Vicariate of Changanassery was Mar Mathew Makil, the former Vicar General for the Knanaya Community.

On 29 August 1911 a new Vicariate Apostolic of Kottayam was erected exclusively for the Knanaya Community by the Apostolic letter "In Universi Christiani" of Pope Pius X. On 21 December 1923 the Vicariate Apostolic of Kottayam was raised to an Eparchy by Pope Pius XI. When the territorial limits of the Syro-Malabar Church was extended in 1955, the jurisdiction of the Eparchy of Kottayam also was made co-extensive with the then extended territory of the Syro-Malabar Church.

On 23 December 2003, Pope John Paul II made a sovereign decision that the status quo of the Eparchy of Kottayam must be maintained and left it to the Bishops’ Synod of the Syro-Malabar church to decide on the desired enhancement of the juridical status of the Eparchy of Kottayam. In November 2004 the synod gave its consent to elevate the Eparchy of Kottayam to the rank of a metropolitan see without a suffragan eparchy. On 21 March 2005 the congregation for the oriental churches issued a letter of no-objection to the decision of the Bishop’s synod. Accordingly, on 9 May 2005 the Major Archbishop Mar Varkey Cardinal Vithayathil issued the decree "The Eparchy of Kottayam" elevating the Eparchy of Kottayam to the rank of a metropolitan see, and another decree "God our loving father", appointing Mar Kuriakose Kunnacherry as the first metropolitan of the newly erected metropolitan see of Kottayam. On 3 June 2005, the feast of the Most Sacred Heart of Jesus, at a liturgical service the Major Archbishop canonically erected the metropolitan see of Kottayam and ordained and enthroned Mar Kuriakose Kunnacherry as the first Metropolitan of Kottayam.

Bibliography 
 Podipara, Placid J. (1970) The Thomas Christians. London: Darton, Longman  and Tidd.
 Poomangalam, C.A. (1998) The Antiquities of the Knanaya Syrian Christians; Kottayam, Kerala.
 Thomas Puthiyakunnel (1973) "Jewish colonies of India paved the way for St. Thomas" in "The Malabar Church" Ed. Jacob Vellian and in "The St. Thomas Christian Encyclopaedia of India," Vol. II, 1973, Ed. George Menachery .
 Fr. Jacob Vellian (2001) Knanite community: History and culture; Syrian church series; vol.XVII; Jyothi Book House, Kottayam
 George Menachery, (1973) The St. Thomas Christian Encyclopedia of India, Ed. George Menachery, B.N.K. Press, vol. 2, .
 George Menachery Ed., (1998) The Indian Church History Classics, Vol. I, The Nazranies & "The Thomapedia" Ed. George Menachery,for many articles on and dozens of photographs of the Kaduthuruthy Big Church.

References

External links
 

Churches in Kottayam district